"Drinking Champagne" is a song written by Bill Mack. He released the first version of the song on Pike Records in the mid-sixties.  The song grabbed nationwide attention when the version by Cal Smith reached #35 on the country music charts in 1968.

The tune also was a local hit in the late sixties by Hawaii's Myra English.

Jerry Lee Lewis released a version of the song on his 1973 album, Live at the International.

It was covered in 1990 by George Strait, whose version was the second single from his album Livin' It Up. The song reached #4 on the Billboard Hot Country Singles & Tracks chart in October 1990.

Chart performance

Cal Smith

George Strait

Year-end charts

Other recordings  
Bill Mack 1967, 
Billy Walker 1968, 
Faron Young 1969, 
Ray Price 1969
Jimmy Dallas (eg. Keith Kissee) 1972
Jim Ed Brown 1973
Don Gibson 1973
Mickey Gilley 1975, 
Dean Martin 1983

Willie Nelson 2010

References

Drinking songs
1960s songs
1968 singles
1973 singles
1990 singles
Cal Smith songs
Jerry Lee Lewis songs
George Strait songs
Songs about alcohol
Songs written by Bill Mack
Song recordings produced by Jimmy Bowen
MCA Records singles
Year of song missing